The Palais de Tokyo (Tokyo Palace) is a building dedicated to modern and contemporary art, located at 13 avenue du Président-Wilson, facing the Trocadéro, in the 16th arrondissement of Paris. The eastern wing of the building belongs to the City of Paris, and hosts the Musée d'Art Moderne de Paris (Paris' Museum of Modern Art). The western wing belongs to the French state and since 2002, has hosted the Palais de Tokyo / Site de création contemporaine, the largest museum in France dedicated to temporary exhibitions of contemporary art.

The building is separated from the River Seine by the Avenue de New-York, which was formerly named Quai Debilly and later Avenue de Tokio (from 1918 to 1945). The name Palais de Tokyo derives from the name of this street.

History
The monument was inaugurated by President Lebrun on 24 May 1937, at the time of the International Exposition of Art and Technology in Modern Life (1937). The original name of the building was Palais des Musées d'art moderne ("Palace of the Museums of modern art"). The building has since then hosted a number of establishments, projects, and creative spaces. Among them; le musée d'art et d'essai (1977–1986), the FEMIS, the Centre national de la photographie, and in 1986, the Palais du cinéma. The current contemporary art center opened to the public in March 2002, under the new name Site de création contemporaine ("Site for contemporary creation"), specializing in the emerging French and international art scene.  It was overhauled and expanded in 2012, by the architects Anne Lacaton and Jean-Philippe Vassal, who subsequently won the Pritzker Prize. With no permanent collection, It is "reputed to be the biggest non-collecting contemporary art museum in Europe", and produces all of its exhibitions.

Directors
In March 2002, Nicolas Bourriaud and Jérôme Sans launched the Site de création contemporaine in the west wing of Palais de Tokyo. Endowed with a restricted operating budget, but run by a brilliant and committed team, it soon became simply known as Palais de Tokyo, quickly making its mark as a trendsetter in the art world.

The Palais de Tokyo has since been led by the following:
 2006–2012: Marc-Olivier Wahler
 2012–2018: Jean de Loisy 
 2021–2022: Emma Lavigne
 2022–present: Guillaume Désanges

Le Pavillon
The Pavillon ran from 2001 to 2017, and facilitated over 130 international artists. Intended as a studio and laboratory space for resident artists and curators invited to the project, the Pavillon was an experimental program, designed to demonstrate the resident artists' youthful creativity. Since the opening of the building, the director of the programme was artist and filmmaker, Ange Leccia. The residency programme was sponsored by Banque Neuflize OBC, The Ministry of Culture and Communication, and the Cité internationale des arts.

Notable Pavillon residents 
 Emma Dusong (Knight of the Order of the Arts and the Letters, 2020)
 Mati Diop (Grand Prix Cannes Festival, 2019)
 Angela Detanico and Rafaël Lain (Brazilian Pavilion, Venice Art Biennale, 2007)
 Laurent Grasso (Marcel Duchamp Prize 2007)
 Apichatpong Weerasethakul (Palme d’or Cannes Festival, 2010)
 Isabelle Cornaro (the Ricard Foundation Prize, 2010)
 Benoît Maire (the Ricard Foundation Prize, 2010)
 Koki Tanaka (Special Mention of the Japan pavilion, Venice Art Biennale, 2013)
 Oliver Beer (Daiwa Foundation Prize, 2015)

All Pavillon residents

Palais /
The Museum also publishes the magazine Palais /, which annually releases three editions (Spring, Fall, and Summer) and was created in 2006 by Marc-Olivier Wahler. The Magazine features articles centering around a central artistic theme selected for each edition. The subjects are conceptual, and are explored using photography, various artistic media, essays, and often experimental media. The theme generally coincides with the exhibition concurrently featured at the museum.

In addition to Palais /, Palais de Tokyo also published five volumes of a contemporary art encyclopedia, From Yodeling to Quantum Physics between 2007 and 2011.

See also
 Art Deco in Paris
 List of museums in Paris

References

External links

 
 Palais de Tokyo at Google Arts & Culture

1937 establishments in France
Art Deco architecture in France
Art museums and galleries in Paris
Art museums established in 1937
Buildings and structures in the 16th arrondissement of Paris
World's fair architecture in Paris
Exposition Internationale des Arts et Techniques dans la Vie Moderne